Five Nights at Freddy's: The Silver Eyes is a horror mystery novel written by Scott Cawthon and Kira Breed-Wrisley. The novel follows Charlie and her childhood friends who return to their hometown of Hurricane, Utah, to commemorate a friend who was murdered at Freddy Fazbear's Pizza ten years ago. After entering the pizzeria, they are pursued by the killer William Afton, who was never caught. 

The Silver Eyes is the debut novel of Cawthon and Breed-Wrisley, hired from ghostwriting firm Kevin Anderson & Associates. It the first licensed novel based on Cawthon's video game series Five Nights at Freddy's. While several elements carried on to the games, it is considered to be in a separate continuity. Digitally self-published in 2015, it was published in print by Scholastic the following year before spending four weeks at #1 on The New York Times Best Seller list in Young Adult Paperbacks. The Silver Eyes was followed by sequels The Twisted Ones (2017) and The Fourth Closet (2018) and a graphic novel adaptation in 2019.

Plot 
In 1995, 17-year-old Charlotte Emily (known as "Charlie") returns to her hometown, Hurricane, Utah, to attend the launch of a scholarship dedicated to her childhood friend Michael Brooks. Michael and four other children were murdered at a local family restaurant, Freddy Fazbear's Pizza, 10 years ago. Charlie's father, Henry, designer of the restaurant's animatronic mascots, was suspected of murder, and consequently died by suicide by allowing an unknown animatronic to kill him. Charlie reunites with her friends, Carlton Burke, John, and Jessica, to revisit the restaurant. They discover that it has been surrounded by a partially-built mall and locate a back route into the pizzeria, finding all the animatronics still in place.

Following the ceremony to honor Michael, John tells Charlie that he remembers seeing a person in a yellow Freddy Fazbear costume on the day of Michael's death, suspecting that this stranger was the murderer. That night, Charlie and her friends return to the restaurant, further accompanied by friends Marla, Lamar, and Marla's younger half-brother Jason, who was only one at the time of Michael's murder. While playing an impulsive game of hide-and-seek with John, Charlie encounters one of the animatronics, Foxy the Pirate, who she was terrified of as a child. Recalling suppressed details of her childhood, Charlie remembers that Henry used to own another restaurant in New Harmony, named Fredbear's Family Diner, featuring two animatronics: yellow versions of Freddy and Bonnie.

Charlie and John drive to New Harmony, where Charlie recalls the day her twin brother, Sammy, was kidnapped by someone wearing a distinct yellow Bonnie costume. This led to her parents divorcing and leaving the original restaurant. Charlie suspects Sammy's abduction and Michael's murder are connected. Later, the teenagers return to Freddy's once again, only to encounter the mall's lone security guard Dave. He had blocked their entrance and in their eagerness to see Freddy's again, they asked him to join them. Upon entering however, Dave unexpectedly retrieves a Spring Bonnie costume and kidnaps Carlton The group flee, informing Carlton's father, police chief Clay Burke, who suspects it is just another of his son's pranks. He invites the group to stay the night in his home until his son returns from his prank in the morning. In the meanwhile, police officer Dunn, is sent to investigate the abandoned restaurant alone but is murdered by Dave in the Spring Bonnie suit.

Meanwhile, John and Charlie research Fredbear's history in the library, discovering a newspaper article on Sammy's kidnapping. A background check that Clay discovers reveals "Dave Miller", whose true name is identified as William Afton, was co-owner of both restaurants. Separate scenes with Clay reveal that Afton was the primary suspect in the murders, but no direct evidence could be found against him. Back at the restaurant, Afton has placed Carlton in a costume, which can be worn by both humans and animatronics through a series of spring-loaded mechanisms called "spring locks". These locks could be lethal if triggered whilst a human is wearing the suit. When Carlton asks Afton how he knows about this, Afton deliberately reveals unnaturally symmetrical pairs of half-moon cuts, first noticed by Charlie when they met "Dave". William Afton was the true creator of these horrible reminders of hell.

Jason returns to the restaurant to save Carlton, followed by Charlie and her friends. They rescue Carlton - Charlie using her memories with her dad to release him from the spring lock suit - and promptly knock out and tie up "Dave". They force him awake with a water bucket and question him about the murders. He coldly refuses to speak until Charlie notices he's staring at the yellow Bonnie head. Annoyed, she places it over his head, where he begins to speak fluidly. He claims the suits are haunted by the souls of the dead children, and that they don't remember who killed them. He also claims that he will "walk over their corpses in the morning" - referring to the group - because the dead children see him as "one of them" while in his suit. Shaken by his answer, they attempt to leave the place, only to swiftly find that the animatronics – Freddy, Bonnie, Chica, and Foxy – are aggressive towards them. This becomes obvious as Charlie is chased by Bonnie, Jason is taken by Foxy, and is later hunted by Freddy, along with Marla and Lamar, all are chased by Chica, and an unknown animatronic nearly breaks down the security room door that protected both John and Jessica. The group eventually gets surrounded by the animatronics all at once, fully expecting they will be killed by them, but are saved when a fifth animatronic, the yellow Freddy suit (Golden Freddy) shows up. All the animatronics freeze on place. They all hear whispers from the empty suit; Michael's gentle spirit revealing itself. Clay then bursts through the brick walls with a sledgehammer, finding the group standing together and the animatronics frozen in place nearby. He begins to lead the group out to safety, but in a last attempt to do harm, Afton attacks Charlie in the Spring Bonnie suit. Charlie then activates the costume's spring locks, apparently killing Afton, and his body is dragged away by the animatronics, allowing the group to leave safely with Clay. The Golden Freddy suit disappears.

The group quietly goes their separate ways, the book leaving off with Charlie going to a cemetery to visit two unknown graves, recalling happier times with her father.

Background 
Five Nights at Freddy's is a point-and-click survival horror video game series, created by independent developer Scott Cawthon. In the first game, Five Nights at Freddy's (2014), the player acts as a night security guard at a pizzeria, where for five nights they must survive against four animatronic mascots who attempt to kill them until their shift ends. The game gained a cult following, and three sequels had been released before The Silver Eyes was first published. Early installments include hidden lore which reveals that several children were murdered at the restaurant and the victims now possess the animatronics. The third game reveals that the perpetrator died from a spring lock failure and Sister Location (2016), released after the book, reveals them to be the proprietor William Afton, who also designed the animatronics in his restaurants.

Publication history 
In December 2015, Cawthon announced on Steam that he and a professional writer had been working on a Five Nights at Freddy's novel for the last ten months. He also said that the book would "[expand] the mythos and [reveal] a human element never before seen in the games". Cawthon's website soon teased that the novel would be titled Five Nights at Freddy's: The Untold Story and digitally self-published on Amazon Kindle on the 22nd, before being published in print on a later date. However, the title was later hidden and changed to Five Nights at Freddy's: The Silver Eyes. Due to confusion with the system, the e-book was accidentally released early on the 17th. Written by Cawthon and Kira Breed-Wrisley, hired from ghostwriting firm Kevin Anderson & Associates, The Silver Eyes is the first licensed Five Nights at Freddy's novel.

The paperback edition of the book was published by Scholastic on September 27, 2016.

Reception 
Although it was released to resounding success, Five Nights at Freddy's: The Silver Eyes drew criticism from fans, as they did not see connections between the novel and the video game franchise. Therefore, as fans had claims of the book's lore conflicting with that of the games' lore, Cawthon replied that: "The games and the books should be considered to be separate continuities, even if they do share many familiar elements. So yes, the book is canon, just as the games are. That doesn't mean that they are intended to fit together like two puzzle pieces. [...] The book is a re-imagining of the Five Nights at Freddy's story, and if you go into it with that mindset, I think you will really enjoy it."

The book spent four weeks at #1 on The New York Times bestseller list in Young Adult Paperbacks.

Legacy

Video games 
Several elements from The Silver Eyes (and its sequels) were adopted by the video games.

Sequels and adaptations 
Cawthon and Breed-Wrisley wrote two sequels to The Silver Eyes: The Twisted Ones was released on June 27, 2017, and The Fourth Closet was released on June 26, 2018. Both reached #1 bestselling on Amazon. A graphic novel adaptation illustrated by Claudia Schröder was released on December 26, 2019. Kirkus Reviews and School Library Journal praised Schröder's simple art in escalating the horror. The Journal felt it was worth reading even for those unfamiliar with the source material. However, Kirkus Reviews felt it was hard to keep track of the characters and their relationships—the Journal pointed out a romance which it felt was little more than a plot device—and that the otherwise engaging plot was disturbed by "abrupt transitions and a too-quick resolution".

References

External links 

2010s horror novels
2015 American novels
Young adult novels
Fiction set in 1985
Fiction set in 1995
S
Novels based on video games
Novels about robots
Novels about missing people
Novels set in Utah
CreateSpace books